

Definition
The difference between the duration of assets and liabilities held by a financial entity.

Overview
The duration gap is a financial and accounting term and is typically used by banks, pension funds, or other financial institutions to measure their risk due to changes in the interest rate. This is one of the mismatches that can occur and are known as asset–liability mismatches.

Another way to define Duration Gap is: it is the difference in the price sensitivity of interest-yielding assets and the price sensitivity of liabilities (of the organization) to a change in market interest rates (yields).

The duration gap measures how well matched are the timings of cash inflows (from assets) and cash outflows (from liabilities).

When the duration of assets is larger than the duration of liabilities, the duration gap is positive. In this situation, if interest rates rise, assets will lose more value than liabilities, thus reducing the value of the firm's equity. If interest rates fall, assets will gain more value than liabilities, thus increasing the value of the firm's equity.

Conversely, when the duration of assets is less than the duration of liabilities, the duration gap is negative. If interest rates rise, liabilities will lose more value than assets, thus increasing the value of the firm's equity. If interest rates decline, liabilities will gain more value than assets, thus decreasing the value of the firm's equity.

By duration matching, that is creating a zero duration gap, the firm becomes immunized against interest rate risk. Duration has a double-facet view. It can be beneficial or harmful depending on where interest rates are headed.

Some of the limitations of duration gap management include the following:
 the difficulty in finding assets and liabilities of the same duration
 some assets and liabilities may have patterns of cash flows that are not well defined
 customer prepayments may distort the expected cash flows in duration
 customer defaults may distort the expected cash flows in duration
 convexity can cause problems.

When the duration gap is zero, the firm is immunized only if the size of the liabilities equals the size of the assets. In this example with a two-year loan of one million and a one-year asset of two millions, the firm is still exposed to rollover risk after one year when the remaining year of the two-year loan has to be financed.

See also
 List of finance topics
 Bond convexity
 The duration difference is also shown by sorting into maturity buckets as in the table How the example bank manages its liquidity

References

Banking
Insurance
Liability (financial accounting)
Asset management
Fixed income analysis